Kulow may refer to:
Wittichenau, Saxony, Germany - Kulow in Sorbian
Kulów, Lower Silesia, Poland